Stefan Stangl (born 20 October 1991) is an Austrian professional footballer who plays as a left-back.

Career
Stangl joined Sturm Graz in 2001, and having advanced through the club's youth system made his debut for the second team in a 4–2 defeat by SC Weiz in Regional League Central on 2 June 2009. He made his first-team debut as a late substitute in a Champions League qualifier against FC Zestafoni of Georgia on 26 July 2011. After making three further appearances for Sturm Graz, Stangl was loaned to First League side SV Grödig in January 2012. He left Sturm Graz in the summer of 2012 to join SV Horn, where he established himself as a first-team regular in the First League. He joined SC Wiener Neustadt of the  Bundesliga a year later.

In summer 2014, he moved to Rapid Wien signing a contract until 2017. At the occasion of his signing, Rapid's general manager Andreas Müller described him as "strong in the air" and "standing out by his competitive spirit".

On 10 January 2022, Stangl was released from his contract with SV Wehen Wiesbaden by mutual consent.

International career
Stangl was named in Austria's senior squad for a 2018 FIFA World Cup qualifier against Wales in September 2016.

References

1991 births
Living people
Association football defenders
Austrian footballers
Austrian Football Bundesliga players
2. Liga (Austria) players
Austrian Regionalliga players
Slovak Super Liga players
3. Liga players
SK Sturm Graz players
SV Grödig players
SV Horn players
SC Wiener Neustadt players
SK Rapid Wien players
FC Red Bull Salzburg players
ŠK Slovan Bratislava players
SKN St. Pölten players
Türkgücü München players
SV Wehen Wiesbaden players
Expatriate footballers in Slovakia
Austrian expatriate sportspeople in Slovakia
Expatriate footballers in Germany
Austrian expatriate sportspeople in Germany
Austrian expatriate footballers